Châu Thành is a township and capital of Châu Thành District, Bến Tre Province, Vietnam.

References

Populated places in Bến Tre province
District capitals in Vietnam
Townships in Vietnam